Elvis Christian Yonwa-Toonga (born 20 November, 1997) is an English professional footballer who plays central midfielder.

Playing career
Born in London, Toonga joined Arsenal's youth system at the age of 8. After being released in 2013 at age 16, he had short spells at Southampton and Cardiff City before signing a professional deal with AFC Wimbledon on 12, June 2015.

On 24, October 2015 Toonga made his Football League debut, coming on as a late substitute for Lyle Taylor in a 3–1 away win against York City. On 11 March, 2016, he left the club by mutual consent.

Prison
On 17, July 2017, Toonga was arrested and spent two and a half years in prison for dealing with heroin and cocaine.

References

External links

1997 births
Living people
Footballers from Greater London
English footballers
Association football midfielders
English Football League players
AFC Wimbledon players
Black British sportspeople